Edison Chouest Offshore (ECO), started as Edison Chouest Boat Rentals in 1960, is family of companies in the marine transportation business based in Cut Off, Louisiana. ECO owns and operates a fleet of Platform supply vessels, Subsea Construction / IMR vessels, a Riserless Light Well Intervention vessel, Anchor handling tug supply vessels, Oil Spill Response Vessels, and Well Stimulation Vessels, as well as an independently owned fleet of Research Vessels and Ice Breakers.

ECO operates five shipyards: North American Shipbuilding (NAS) in Larose was started in 1974. Chouest added North American Fabricators, (NAF), in Houma, in 1996 (now part of LaShip), Estaleiro NavShip, in Brazil, in 2005, Gulf Ship, in Gulfport MS, in 2007, Tampa Ship, the former Tampa Bay Shipbuilding, in 2008, and La Ship, in Houma, in 2011.

ECO's offshore vessels range from 109 feet to 525 feet.

References

Companies based in Louisiana
American shipbuilders